Roldanillo is a town and  municipality located in the Department of Valle del Cauca, Colombia.

It is also a tourist hotspot and known as Colombia's flying capital. It has hosted a range of international competitions, including the paragliding  world cup superfinals.  Roldanillo is the birthplace of Omar Rayo Reyes (January 20, 1928 – June 7, 2010). He was a renowned Colombian painter, sculptor, caricaturist and plastic artist. He won the 1970 Salón de Artistas Colombianos. Rayo worked with abstract geometry primarily employing black, white, red and yellow. He was part of the Op Art movement. Rayo's work shows that geometric art is as much a part of the past as it is of the future. He used traces of the past to discover new ways to present visual and geometric sketches. The Museo Rayo de Dibujo y Grabado Latinoamericano was founded on January 20, 1981 by Rayo in his hometown of Roldanillo with funds the artist himself provided. The museum was also funded with help from the Colombian government and others so that this site would remain a permanent exhibit of his works of art during the late 1980s. The museum was designed by Mexican architect Leopoldo Gout and opened with a collection of 2,000 of Rayo's artwork and some 500 other Latin American artists' works. The museum contains a library, many modules for expositions, a graphic arts workshop and a theater. Sadly government care has been diminishing, and Miss Agueda Pizarro had found a hard time carrying by with financial sustainment. Several activities are carried out by the foundation of the museum's for promoting arts in the region.

Roldanillo's Occidente bus terminal has service to Cali, Rozo, Tulua, Buga, Armenia, Cartago, and Pereira, as well as nearby towns such as Zarzal, El Dovio, Naranjal, La Union, Sevilla, Andalucia, Primavera, and La Tulia.

Municipalities of Valle del Cauca Department